A Private Scandal is a 1921 American drama film directed by Chester M. Franklin and written by Eve Unsell. The film stars May McAvoy, Bruce Gordon, Ralph Lewis, Kathlyn Williams, Lloyd Whitlock, and Gladys Fox. The film was released on June 12, 1921, by Realart Pictures Corporation.

Cast   
May McAvoy as Jeanne Millett
Bruce Gordon as Jerry Hayes
Ralph Lewis as Phillip Lawton
Kathlyn Williams as Carol Lawton
Lloyd Whitlock as Alec Crosby
Gladys Fox as Betty Lawton

References

External links

1921 films
1920s English-language films
Silent American drama films
1921 drama films
American silent feature films
American black-and-white films
1920s American films
English-language drama films